Hani Al Taiar (born May 1, 1990 in Homs) is a retired Syrian footballer.

International career
Al Taiar plays between 2007–2008 for the Under-17 and the Under-19 Syrian national team. He was a part of the Syrian U-17 national team in the FIFA U-17 World Cup 2007. in South Korea.
He plays against Argentina, Spain and Honduras in the group-stage of the FIFA U-17 World Cup 2007 and against England in the Round of 16. He scored one goal against Honduras in the third match of the group-stage.

He plays for the Syrian U-19 national team in the AFC U-19 Championship 2008 in Saudi Arabia and is currently a member of the Syrian U-23 national team.
He was a part of the Syrian U-23 national team in the Mediterranean Games 2009 in Italy.

National team career statistics

Honour and titles

Club
Al-Karamah
Syrian Premier League:
Winner (1): 2008–09
Syrian Cup:
Winner (1): 2008–09
Syrian Super Cup:
Winner (1): 2007–08

References

External links
 
 Career stats at goalzz.com
 Career stats at Kooora.com (Arabic)
 Al Taiar`s goal against Honduras in the 2007 FIFA U-17 World Cup (youtube.com)

1990 births
Living people
Syrian footballers
Al-Karamah players
Association football forwards
Sportspeople from Homs
Syria international footballers
Syrian expatriate footballers
Expatriate footballers in Bahrain
Expatriate footballers in Jordan
Syrian expatriate sportspeople in Bahrain
Syrian expatriate sportspeople in Jordan
Al-Faisaly SC players
Syrian Premier League players